The Spencer Buford House is a property in Thompsons Station, Tennessee, United States, that was listed on the National Register of Historic Places in 1988.  The main house was built about 1813. The property is also known as Roderick, in honor of the horse Roderick, a favorite horse of Confederate cavalry and irregular forces Nathan Bedford Forrest.

It was a two-story brick side Side passage plan farmhouse built c.1820.  It is unusual in Williamson County for the side passage plan.  Its "doorway displays excellent Federal detailing."  It was built of bricks made by slaves in kiln on the farm.

Besides the house the property included one non-contributing building.

The property was covered in a 1988 study of Williamson County historical resources.

In November 2015 the house was evaluated as having lost its historic integrity, because it had been altered with "unsympathetic" additions that subsumed much of the original house, and yet lost the interior details in the original portion retained.

It was removed from the National Register in 2015.

References

External links
Roderick Place

Federal architecture in Tennessee
Former National Register of Historic Places in Tennessee
Houses completed in 1820
Houses in Williamson County, Tennessee
Houses on the National Register of Historic Places in Tennessee
Side passage plan architecture in the United States
National Register of Historic Places in Williamson County, Tennessee